El Hombre que amé is a 1947 Argentine film.

Cast
Delia Garcés
Pedro López Lagar
Olga Casares Pearson
Jorge Salcedo
Julián Bourges
Bertha Moss
Jorge Villoldo
Agustín Orrequia
Adolfo Linvel
Enrique Doyen

External links
 

1947 films
1940s Spanish-language films
Argentine black-and-white films
Argentine drama films
1947 drama films
1940s Argentine films